Luo Andong (born 17 December 1995) is a Chinese footballer currently playing as a midfielder for Liaoning Shenyang Urban.

Career statistics

Club
.

References

1995 births
Living people
Chinese footballers
Association football midfielders
China League One players
Beijing Renhe F.C. players
Inner Mongolia Zhongyou F.C. players
Shandong Taishan F.C. players
21st-century Chinese people